A petition is a written request to the government for action.

Petition may also refer to:

 Petition (film), a 2009 Chinese documentary by Zhao Liang
 Petition (horse) (1944–1964), a British Thoroughbred racehorse

See also
:Category:Petitions

Petitioner, a legal party who pleads through use of a petition
Supplication or petitioning, a form of prayer